The 1973 Men's World Water Polo Championship was the first edition of the men's water polo tournament at the World Aquatics Championships, organised by the world governing body in aquatics, the FINA. The tournament was held from 1 to 9 September 1973, and was incorporated into the inaugural 1973 World Aquatics Championships in Belgrade, Yugoslavia.

Participating teams

Groups formed

GROUP A

GROUP B

GROUP C

Preliminary round

Group A

 1 September 1973

 2 September 1973

 3 September 1973

 4 September 1973

 5 September 1973

Group B

 1 September 1973

 2 September 1973

 3 September 1973

 4 September 1973

 5 September 1973

Group C

 1 September 1973

 2 September 1973

 3 September 1973

 4 September 1973

 5 September 1973

Final round

13th – 16th places (Group F)

Preliminary round results apply.

 6 September 1973

 7 September 1973

 8 September 1973

7th – 12th places (Group E)

Preliminary round results apply.

 6 September 1973

 7 September 1973

 8 September 1973

 9 September 1973

1st – 6th places (Group D)

Preliminary round results apply.

 6 September 1973

 7 September 1973

 8 September 1973

 9 September 1973

Final ranking

Medalists

References

External links
 World Championships 1973, Belgrade - Water polo Men's Tournament www.fina.org
 Men Water Polo I World Championship 1973 Beograd www.todor66.com
 Results

Men
1973